Fernando Martí Haik (–2008) was the 14-year-old son of a wealthy sporting goods chain owner Alejandro Marti, whose kidnapping and murder caused a national outrage in Mexico, with some hoping that involvement of such a wealthy family might help draw attention to the issue. The murder was notable for its implication of mid-level law enforcement officials in Mexico City.

Kidnap and murder
Martí was driven in an armored BMW with a bodyguard to the British American School on June 4, 2008, when he was stopped at a roadblock by officers wearing uniforms of Mexico's Federal Investigations Agency, the equivalent of the United States' Federal Bureau of Investigation. The driver was tortured by having his teeth pulled out and later killed, and the bodyguard was choked. The bodyguard survived and later implicated law enforcement, including Jose Luis Romero, commander of the detective unit at Mexico City International Airport. On July 12, 2008, the ransom of 5,135,000 pesos (about US$404.3K) was agreed, but initially the official information was that a total of US$6 million was paid by all the Marti family. After several days of waiting on August 1, 2008, the body of Fernando Marti was found inside the trunk of a car that was left abandoned in the city. The case prompted public outrage in Mexico, and there was growing pressure to reintroduce capital punishment.

Criminal Investigation
On June 17, 2009, the Subprocuraduría de Investigación Especializada en Delincuencia Organizada (SIEDO), which specializes on criminal organized gangs, initiated an investigation for organized delinquency and kidnapping against the organization of La Flor (The Flower), thought to be responsible for the kidnapping and murder of Fernando Marti Haik.

On October 18, 2010, Alejandro Marti, now president of Mexico SOS, published photos of the alleged criminals. By the time he did so, the "Procuraduria General de la Republica" (PGR) announced that $15,000,000 (about US$1,181,000) would be paid as a reward to anyone who could provide reliable and useful information that contributes to the location, arrest or detention of these criminals. Alejandro Marti declared:

See also 
List of kidnappings
List of solved missing person cases
List of unsolved murders

References

1994 births
2000s missing person cases
2008 deaths
2008 murders in Mexico
Formerly missing people
Incidents of violence against boys
Kidnapped children
Kidnapped Mexican people
Male murder victims
Missing person cases in Mexico
Murdered Mexican children
Murdered students
Murder in Mexico